Theodore R. "Soapy" Coffman was an American football, basketball, and baseball coach and college athletics administrator.  Coffman served as the head football coach at New Mexico College of Agriculture and Mechanic Arts—now New Mexico State University—from 1927 to 1928, compiling a record of 7–10.  At New Mexico A&M was also the head basketball coach from 1927 to 1928 and head baseball coach in 1928, and athletic director from  1927 to 1929.  A native of Santa Ana, California, Coffman played college football and college baseball at the University of Southern California (USC).

Head coaching record

Football

References

Year of birth missing
Year of death missing
American football ends
Baseball catchers
New Mexico State Aggies athletic directors
New Mexico State Aggies baseball coaches
New Mexico State Aggies football coaches
New Mexico State Aggies men's basketball coaches
USC Trojans baseball players
USC Trojans football players
Sportspeople from Santa Ana, California
Players of American football from California
Baseball players from California
Basketball coaches from California